Praha hlavní nádraží  is the largest railway station in Prague, Czech Republic.

It opened in 1871 as Franz Josef Station, after Franz Joseph I of Austria. During the First Republic and from 1945 to 1948 the station was called Wilson Station, after the former President of the United States Woodrow Wilson.

In 2014, the station served 224,505 trains (610 daily) and more than 53,000,000 passengers.

Overview
The Art Nouveau station building and station hall were built between 1901 and 1909, designed by Czech architect Josef Fanta on the site of the old dismantled Neo-Renaissance station designed by Czech architects Antonín Viktor Barvitius and Vojtěch Ignác Ullmann.

The station was extended by a new terminal building, built between 1972 and 1979, including an underground metro station and a main road on the roof of the terminal. The new terminal building claimed a large part of the park, and the construction of the road cut off the neo-renaissance station hall from the town.

In 2011 a partial refurbishment of the station was completed by Italian company Grandi Stazioni, which had leased retail space for 30 years from 2002. In 2016 Grandi Stazioni lost the concession after failing to complete the renovation of the historic building by the extended contractual deadline.

In September 2021, a second exit was opened connecting the station to Winston Churchill Square in Žižkov via an underpass.

The station was the embarkation point for the children evacuated to London Liverpool Street station via the Port of Harwich by Nicholas Winton. In 2009 a statue was unveiled on platform 1 commemorating this.

Train services

Long-distance services
The station is an international transport hub, handling services to Germany (Munich, Bavaria-Bohemia RE (Regio-Express) services, and EuroCity/EuroNight services to Berlin, Dresden and Hamburg), Poland, Slovakia, Austria, Hungary, Switzerland, the Netherlands, Serbia, the Russian Federation, Ukraine, and Croatia in summer. Services are operated by express trains, and also by ČD Class 680 Pendolino. Services to Moravia, Silesia, Slovakia, and Poland are also operated by open-access train operators LEO Express, RegioJet, and Arriva.

Regional services
In addition to international services, trains serve most of the larger Czech cities, such as Brno, Plzeň, České Budějovice, and Olomouc.

Suburban services
The station is served by most of the Esko Prague train lines which are dispatched from the nearby Masaryk Railway station.

Intercity Bus services 
Buses towards Český Krumlov, České Budějovice, Tábor and other Czech cities, as well as the Airport Express bus service to Václav Havel Airport Prague maintained by České dráhy, depart from Wilsonova street in front of the historical building.

City transport at the station
The station is served by the Prague Metro's Line C directly in the area, and by the Prague tram system outside the station about 500 meters past the park in front of the new terminal.

See also
Hlavní nádraží (Prague Metro)
Praha Masarykovo nádraží
Nové spojení

References
Short describtion of Prague Main railway station 

Hlavni Nadrazi
Railway stations opened in 1871
Art Nouveau architecture in Prague
Art Nouveau railway stations
Transport infrastructure completed in 1909
Brutalist architecture in the Czech Republic
19th-century establishments in Bohemia
Railway stations in the Czech Republic opened in the 19th century